Mirjam Puchner (born 18 May 1992) is an Austrian World Cup alpine ski racer from St Johann im Pongau in Salzburg. She made her World Cup debut on 12 January 2013 in St. Anton, Austria. Puchner attained her first World Cup podium in March 2016 at St. Moritz, Switzerland, where she won the downhill event at the season finals.

Born in Schwarzach im Pongau, she is the sister of alpine ski racer Joachim Puchner (born 1987).

World Cup results

Season standings

Race podiums
 2 wins – (2 DH) 
 5 podiums – (4 DH, 1 SG); 23 top tens

World Championship results

Olympic results

References

External links

 
 Mirjam Puchner at the Austrian Ski Team (ÖSV) 
 Mirjam Puchner at Atomic Skis
  

Austrian female alpine skiers
1992 births
Living people
People from St. Johann im Pongau District
Alpine skiers at the 2022 Winter Olympics
Olympic alpine skiers of Austria
Medalists at the 2022 Winter Olympics
Olympic medalists in alpine skiing
Olympic silver medalists for Austria
Sportspeople from Salzburg (state)
20th-century Austrian women
21st-century Austrian women